Naraka (Niraya) is a term in Buddhist cosmology usually referred to in English as "hell" (or "hell realm") or "purgatory". The Narakas of Buddhism are closely related to Diyu, the hell in Chinese mythology. A Naraka differs from one concept of hell in Christianity in two respects: firstly, beings are not sent to Naraka as the result of a divine judgment or punishment; and secondly, the length of a being's stay in a Naraka is not eternal, though it is usually incomprehensibly long.

A being is born into a Naraka as a direct result of its accumulated actions (karma) and resides there for a finite period of time until that karma has achieved its full result. After its karma is used up, it will be reborn in one of the higher worlds as the result of karma that had not yet ripened.

In the Devaduta Sutta, the 130th discourse of Majjhima Nikaya, the Buddha teaches about hell in vivid detail.

Physically, Narakas are thought of as a series of cavernous layers which extend below Jambudvīpa (the ordinary human world) into the earth. There are several schemes for enumerating these Narakas and describing their torments. The Abhidharma-kosa (Treasure House of Higher Knowledge) is the root text that describes the most common scheme, as the Eight Cold Narakas and Eight Hot Narakas.

Cold Narakas
There are eight great cold hells located on one Cakkavāla in Buddhist sutras. 

Arbuda, the "blister" Naraka, is a dark, frozen plain surrounded by icy mountains and continually swept by blizzards. Inhabitants of this world arise fully grown and abide lifelong naked and alone, while the cold raises blisters upon their bodies. The length of life in this Naraka is said to be the time it would take to empty a barrel of sesame seeds if one only took out a single seed every hundred years.
Nirarbuda, the "burst blister" Naraka, is even colder than Arbuda. There, the blisters burst open, leaving the beings' bodies covered with frozen blood and pus. 
Aṭaṭa is the "shivering" Naraka. There, beings shiver in the cold, making an  sound with their mouths.
Hahava is the "lamentation" Naraka. There, the beings lament in the cold, going haa, haa in pain.
Huhuva, the "chattering teeth" Naraka, is where beings shiver as their teeth chatter, making the sound hu, hu. 
Utpala is the "blue lotus" Naraka. The intense cold there makes the skin turn blue like the colour of an utpala waterlily. 
Padma, the "lotus" Naraka, has blizzards that crack open frozen skin, leaving one raw and bloody. 
Mahāpadma is the "great lotus" Naraka. The entire body cracks into pieces and the internal organs are exposed to the cold, also cracking.

Hot Narakas
There is a eight great hot hells located on one Cakkavāla in Buddhist sutras.
Sañjīva, the "reviving" Naraka, has ground made of hot iron heated by an immense fire. Beings in this Naraka appear fully grown, already in a state of fear and misery. As soon as the being begins to fear being harmed by others, their fellows appear and attack each other with iron claws and hell guards appear and attack the being with fiery weapons. As soon as the being experiences an unconsciousness like death, they are suddenly restored to full health and the attacks begin again. Other tortures experienced in this Naraka include: having molten metal dropped upon them, being sliced into pieces, and suffering from the heat of the iron ground. It is said to be 1,000 yojanas beneath Jambudvīpa and 10,000 yojanas in each direction (a yojana being 7 miles, or 11 kilometres).
Kālasūtra, the "black thread" Naraka, includes the torments of Sañjīva. In addition, black lines are drawn upon the body, which hell guards use as guides to cut the beings with fiery saws and sharp axes. 
Saṃghāta, the "crushing" Naraka, is surrounded by huge masses of rock that smash together and crush the beings to a bloody jelly. When the rocks move apart again, life is restored to the being and the process starts again. 
Raurava, the "screaming" Naraka, is where beings run wildly about, looking for refuge from the burning ground. When they find an apparent shelter, they are locked inside it as it blazes around them, while they scream inside.
Mahāraurava, the "great screaming" Naraka, is similar to Raurava. Punishment here is for people who maintain their own body by hurting others. In this hell, ruru  animals known as kravyāda torment them and eat their flesh.
Tapana is the "heating" Naraka, where hell guards impale beings on a fiery spear until flames issue from their noses and mouths. 
Pratāpana, the "great heating" Naraka. The tortures here are similar to the Tapana Naraka, but the beings are pierced more bloodily with a trident. Life in this Naraka is said to last for the length of half an antarakalpa.
Avīci is the "uninterrupted" Naraka. Beings are roasted in an immense blazing oven with terrible suffering. Life in this Naraka is said to last for the length of an antarakalpa.

Each lifetime in these Narakas is eight times the length of the one before it. Some sources describe five hundred or even hundreds of thousands of different Narakas.

The sufferings of the dwellers in Naraka often resemble those of the Pretas, and the two types of being are easily confused. The simplest distinction is that beings in Naraka are confined to their subterranean world, while the Pretas are free to move about.

There are also isolated and boundary hells called Pratyeka Narakas (Pali: Pacceka-niraya) and Lokantarikas.

In Buddhist literature
The Dīrghāgama or Longer Āgama-sūtra (Ch. cháng āhán jīng ), was translated to Chinese in 22 fascicles from an Indic original by Buddhayaśas (Fotuoyeshe ) and Zhu Fonian  in 412–13 CE. This literature contains 30 discrete scriptures in four groups (vargas). The fourth varga, which pertains to Buddhist cosmology, contains a "Chapter on Hell" (dìyù pǐn ) within the Scripture of the Account of the World (shìjì jīng ). In this text, the Buddha describes to the sangha each of the hells in great detail, beginning with their physical location and names:The Buddha told the bhikṣus, There are 8,000 continents surrounding the four continents [on earth]. There is, moreover, a great sea surrounding those 8,000 continents. There is, moreover, a great diamond mountain range encircling that great sea. Beyond this great diamond mountain range is yet another great diamond mountain range. And between the two mountain ranges lies darkness. The sun and moon in the divine sky with their great power are unable to reach that [darkness] with their light. In [that space between the two diamond mountain ranges] there are eight major hells. Along with each major hell are sixteen smaller hells. 

The first major hell is called Thoughts. The second is called Black Rope. The third is called Crushing. The fourth is called Moaning. The fifth is called Great Moaning. The sixth is called Burning. The seventh is called Great Burning. The eighth is called Unremitting. The Hell of Thoughts contains sixteen smaller hells. The smaller hells are 500 square yojana in area. The first small hell is called Black Sand. The second hell is called Boiling Excrement. The third is called Five Hundred Nails. The fourth is called Hunger. The fifth is called Thirst. The sixth is called Single Copper Cauldron. The seventh is called Many Copper Cauldrons. The eighth is called Stone Pestle. The ninth is called Pus and Blood. The tenth is called Measuring Fire. The eleventh is called Ash River. The twelfth is called Iron Pellets. The thirteenth is called Axes and Hatchets. The fourteenth is called Jackals and Wolves. The fifteenth is called Sword Cuts. The sixteenth is called Cold and Ice.Further evidence supporting the importance of these texts discussing hells lies in Buddhists' further investigation of the nature of hell and its denizens. Buddhavarman's fifth century Chinese translation of the Abhidharma-vibhāṣā-śāstra (Ch. āpídámó pípóshā lùn ) questions whether hell wardens who torture hell beings are themselves sentient beings, what form they take, and what language they speak. Xuanzang's  seventh century Chinese translation of the Abhidharmakośa śāstra (Ch. āpídámó jùshè lùn ) too is concerned with whether hell wardens are sentient beings, as well as how they go on to receive karmic retribution, whether they create bad karma at all, and why are they not physically affected and burned by the fires of hell.

Descriptions of the Narakas are a common subject in some forms of Buddhist commentary and popular literature as cautionary tales against the fate that befalls evildoers and an encouragement to virtue.

The Mahāyāna Sūtra of the bodhisattva  (Dìzàng or Jizō) graphically describes the sufferings in Naraka and explains how ordinary people can transfer merit in order to relieve the sufferings of the beings there.

The Japanese monk Genshin began his Ōjōyōshū with a description of the suffering in Naraka. Tibetan Lamrim texts also included a similar description.

Chinese Buddhist texts considerably enlarged upon the description of Naraka (Diyu), detailing additional Narakas and their punishments, and expanding the role of Yama and his helpers, Ox-Head and Horse-Face. In these texts, Naraka became an integral part of the otherworldly bureaucracy which mirrored the imperial Chinese administration.

Gallery

See also
Bon Festival
Diyu
Ghost Festival
Hell money
Ksitigarbha
Maudgalyayana
Ox-Head and Horse-Face
Ullambana Sutra
Yama (East Asia)

Notes

Further reading

External links
Reality
Bhaktivedanta VedaBase 
The Hellish Worlds or the Karmic Rebound
The Thirty-one Planes of Existence
 The Asian Classics Institute course on Death and the Realms of Existence

Buddhist cosmology
Judgment in religion
Buddhism
Buddhist philosophical concepts